Kaichiro Kitamura is a Japanese vocal percussionist, singer, and music teacher who has performed vocal percussion, in both a cappella and instrumental groups. He specializes in jazz but has also done rock, pop, and RnB.

Sound and style
Kaichiro is a pioneering figure in mouth drumming well known for his outstanding ability to realistically vocalize the sounds of a drum kit, to provide the full rhythm section necessary for his projects and groups. He's developed his own vocal percussion style characterized by his signature sound methods and usage of jazz drumming rhythms. He defines his style as "jazz vocal percussion". He is also a bass singer who can vocalize walking basslines.

Early life

Kaichiro has performed vocal percussion since childhood and became famous as the Vocal Percussionist and baritone for the Japanese a cappella group "TRY-TONE".

Career
Kaichiro has collaborated with many groups, including The Real Group, The House Jacks, and Naturally 7 among others. 
He is a member of groups, such as Japanese jazz quartets, "HamojiN" and "Solo-Duo". He is an avid jazz vocal percussion instructor who has taught workshops around the world. He is currently serving as session vocal percussionist, for Australian a cappella group "The idea of north" was featured on their recent album and is currently touring with them. He is also serving as a Japanese Representative of 'Vocal Asia' -Asian vocal music network in Taiwan.

Discography

Collabs
"Pollen" with The House Jacks. 2014
"Balads" with The Idea of North. 2016

With hamonjin
"Spain" (Single). 2016

References

Japanese male singers
Japanese music educators
Japanese performance artists
Living people
Year of birth missing (living people)